The Kenneth L. Hale Award, named after linguist Kenneth L. Hale, is an award given to a member of the Linguistic Society of America in order to recognize "scholars who have done outstanding work on the documentation of a particular language or family of languages that is endangered or no longer spoken." It has been described as one "response to the urgency of recording endangered languages before they disappear."

Recipients 

Kathleen Bragdon (2002): Massachusett
Ives Goddard (2002): Massachusett 
Robert W. Young (2006): Navajo
Nicholas Evans (2011): Aboriginal languages: Mayali, Kunwinjku and Kune, Kayardild, Dalabon
Nancy Dorian (2012): Scots Gaelic
Claire Bowern (2014): Bardi
Anvita Abbi (2015): Great Andamanese
Melissa Axelrod (2017): Koyukon, Dene, Tanoan, and Ixil
Nora England (2016): Mam and Mayan
Tucker Childs (2018): Bolom group, Kisi, Bom, Mani, Kim, and Sherbro
Judith Aissen (2019): Mayan languages
Patience Epps (2020): Naduhup languages

See also
Victoria A. Fromkin Lifetime Service Award

References

External links
Kenneth L. Hale Award (Linguistic Society of America)

American awards
Linguistic Society of America